The Columbia Comers were a minor league baseball team, based in Columbia, South Carolina and played in the South Atlantic League.  

Columbia's first professional team was known as the Senators and played in the short-lived first South Atlantic League season in 1892. The city did not have a professional baseball team again until 1903 when the Columbia Skyscrapers played a non-league season. In 1904, the Skyscrapers joined the new South Atlantic League and changed their name to the Columbia Gamecocks midway through the season, playing under that moniker for three and a half years. The team played as the Columbia Chicks in 1908, the Columbia Palmettos in 1909, and the Columbia Blues in 1910.  In 1911, the club was finally named the Columbia Comers which was short for Commissioners. During their first year with the new name, the Comers won the second half of the South Atlantic League season before losing to the Columbus Foxes in the league championship playoff series.

In 1911, the club was finally named the Comers, and would eventually win four league titles. They briefly played part of their 1923 season in Gastonia, North Carolina as the Gastonia Combers. From 1927 until 1930, the team was an affiliate of the Pittsburgh Pirates.

Season-by-season

Baseball teams established in 1904
Sports clubs disestablished in 1930
Defunct minor league baseball teams
Pittsburgh Pirates minor league affiliates
South Atlantic League (1904–1963) teams
Defunct South Atlantic League teams
Baseball teams disestablished in 1930
Sports in Columbia, South Carolina